Staniforth Range is a mountain range located in Gulf Province, Papua New Guinea. Yeripa and Taripa villages are the nearest populated places to the range.

History
The mountain range is named after Miles Staniforth Cater Smith, an Australian politician who played a role in the passing of the Papua Act 1905 which saw the transfer of the territory of Papua from Britain to Australia.

References

Mountain ranges of Papua New Guinea